"Penny & Me" is a song written and performed by American pop-rock band Hanson, produced by Hanson and Danny Kortchmar. It was released as the first single from the band's third commercial studio album, Underneath (2004), on February 23, 2004. The song peaked at number two on the US Billboard Hot 100 Singles Sales chart, number 28 on the Irish Singles Chart, and number 10 on the UK Singles Chart. It also reached the top 40 in Italy and was a minor hit in Germany and the Netherlands.

Music video
The music video features actress Samaire Armstrong and was directed by Chris Applebaum.

Track listings
All songs were written by Isaac Hanson, Taylor Hanson, and Zac Hanson.

US CD single
 "Penny & Me" (radio edit)
 "Every Word I Say"
 "Penny & Me"
 "Hey"

Australian CD single
 "Penny & Me"
 "Every Word I Say"
 "Penny & Me"
 "Hey"
 "Penny & Me" (video)

UK CD1
 "Penny & Me" (radio edit) – 3:40
 "MMMBop" (live) – 3:27

UK CD2
 "Penny & Me" (album version)
 "Every Word I Say"
 "Underneath" (live acoustic)
 "Penny & Me" (music video)
 "Underneath" (live concert video)

Charts

Release history

References

2004 singles
2004 songs
Cooking Vinyl singles
Hanson (band) songs
Music videos directed by Chris Applebaum
Songs written by Isaac Hanson
Songs written by Taylor Hanson
Songs written by Zac Hanson